Kate Stilley Steiner is a filmmaker, editor, and producer. She co-founded Citizen Film, a San Francisco-based not-for-profit production company which "creates films and online media that foster active engagement in cultural and civic life."

Her past producing and editing credits include the feature-length documentaries Throwing Curves, about 103-year-old industrial designer Eva Zeisel, Wired For What? for PBS, Thinking Like A Watershed; and The Mystery of the Last Tsar for The Learning Channel.

Stilley's other editing credits include work on the award-winning documentaries: The Story Of Mothers and Daughters for ABC Television; Fox Television's Emmy Award-winning Loyalty and Betrayal: The Story Of The American Mob; and the Academy Award nominated Freedom On My Mind.

She has also worked closely with Debra Chasnoff of Groundspark for several years, producing and editing That’s A Family! and Let’s Get Real, films that help teens deal with the problems of bullying and stereotyping. The recent, A Foot in the Door, profiles San Francisco's Kindergarten to College program, which aims to instill financial literacy in public school kids, grades K - 12.

External links 
 Kate Stilley Steiner Biography
 Citizen Film

References

American documentary filmmakers
Living people
Year of birth missing (living people)